Super Taxman 2 is a 1981 video game published by H.A.L. Labs.

Gameplay
Super Taxman 2 is a game in which the player must navigate four different mazes in this version of the original Taxman.

Reception
Anthony Melendez reviewed the game for Computer Gaming World, and stated that "Despite the fact that maze-chase games have been overused, ST2 is a nice little game."

References

External links
Review in Softalk
Entry in The Book of Apple Software

1981 video games
Apple II games
Apple II-only games
Maze games
Video game clones
Video game sequels
Video games developed in the United States